Friedrich (Frederic) Weber (5 November 1819 – 16 February 1909) was a German organist and composer.

Born in Künzelsau, Württemberg, Weber studied music in Stuttgart, and became a teacher at the Pestalozzi-Institut in Worksop (Nottinghamshire) in 1841 after spending a year in Esslingen.  1845 he was appointed organist at the  „Hamburger Lutherische Kirche“ (Hamburg Lutheran Church) in the City of London. For 52 years, from 1849 to his retirement in 1901, he served as organist at the German Chapel Royal at Saint James´s Palace. He married in 1851 and died in London in 1909 and is buried on the west side of Highgate Cemetery.

As a composer, Weber was primarily active in the area of chamber music. 20 works with opus numbers are known. His compositions were mainly published in Germany.
 In 1900, Weber was awarded The Royal Order of the Crown by the German Emperor.

Weber also authored several books about music with the aim of furthering musical understanding, especially for amateurs.

Works 
Musical Compositions
Chamber music, Opus 1 – 20

Thereof
 4 Piano trios
 op. 13 G Major
 op. 14, D Major
 op. 15, F Major, Trio facile
 op. 20, E flat Major
 6 Duos for Viola (or Cello) and Piano, op. 18

Texts about music

 Popular history of music from the earliest times
 The pianist’s practical guide
 Comprehensive counterpoint
 Numeral notation, or An easy method of mastering harmony and counterpoint

External links 
 Chamber music works in the online Petrucci music library IMSLP, Petrucci-music library
 Works in the catalogue of the British Library
 Biography in Schwäbischen Orgelromantik by Siegfried Gmeiner

References

1819 births
1909 deaths
Burials at Highgate Cemetery
German classical musicians
German organists
German male organists
People from Künzelsau
19th-century German male musicians
19th-century organists